The following is a complete chronology of the lineups of the Czech progressive rock group Už jsme doma.  The band formed in 1985 in Teplice, Czechoslovakia.

Timeline

Uz Jsme Doma